Jannat al-Mu'alla, also known as the "Cemetery of Ma'la" and Al-Ḥajūn, is a cemetery to the north of Al-Masjid Al-Haram, and near the Mosque of the Jinn in Makkah, Saudi Arabia. It is the place where the Islamic prophet Muhammad's wife, grandfather, and other ancestors are buried.

History

Many of Muhammad's relatives were buried in this cemetery before his Hijrah in 622. Many domes and structures have been built or rebuilt over known graves over the years. Tombs in this cemetery were demolished in 1925, the same year that the Jannat al-Baqi' cemetery in Medina was demolished by Saudi King, Ibn Saud. This happened despite protests by the international Islamic community. Some Shiites continue to mourn the day the House of Saud demolished shrines in Al-Baqi, which has been named Yaum-e Gham or "Day of Sorrow", and protest the Saudi government's demolition of these shrines.

Notable interments

Historical figures buried here include:
 Abu Talib ibn Abdul-Muttalib, uncle of Muhammad and father of Ali
 Abd Manaf, great-great-grandfather of Muhammad
 Abdul Mutallib, grandfather of Muhammad
 Khadija, the best and most beloved wife of Muhammad
 Rahmatullah Kairanwi, 19th-century Indian Muslim scholar and author of Izhar ul-Haqq
 Imdadullah Muhajir Makki, another 19th-century Indian Muslim scholar
 Abu Turab al-Zahiri, 20th-century Muslim cleric
 Muhammad Alawi al-Maliki, 20th-century Sunni Muslim cleric
 Muhammadhadji Ubudi ad-Dagistani, 19th-century Sunni Muslim cleric
 Mulla Ali Qari Herawi, famous Sunni scholar of Tafseer Quran, Fiqh, Theology, Arabic Language
Abdullah Ibn Zubair, a companion of Muhammad and a nephew of  Aisha
Asma' bint Abi Bakr, a companion of Muhammad and mother of Abdullah ibn Zubair 
Al Qasim ibn Muhammad, the first son of  Muhammad and Khadija

See also
 Jannat al-Baqi'
 Bab Saghir
 Holiest sites in Sunni Islam
 Holiest sites in Shia Islam

References

External links

Family of Muhammad
Islamic shrines in Saudi Arabia
Cemeteries in Saudi Arabia
Buildings and structures in Mecca
Burial sites of the Abbasid dynasty